Club Esportiu Mataró is a Spanish football team based in Mataró, in the autonomous community of Catalonia. Founded in 1939, they currently play in the Primera Catalana, holding home games at Municipal Carles Padrós, which has a capacity of 4,500.

The club competes in both association football and futsal, and also possessed a basketball team, whose women's section won three leagues from 1972 to 1974.

Season to season

4 seasons in Segunda División B
33 seasons in Tercera División

Former players
 Cesc Fàbregas (youth)

References

External links
Official website 

Football clubs in Catalonia
Association football clubs established in 1939
Divisiones Regionales de Fútbol clubs
1939 establishments in Spain
Mataró